Wendell Moore (born 18 September 1964) is a former Trinidad and Tobago footballer and coach.

Career 
Moore was born in Bethel, Tobago. He played in his early career for the Signal Hill Senior Comprehensive School and on the Fairleigh Dickinson University for the Teneck Men Soccer team. He played after his graduating on the FDU in the year 1987, over ten years with Florida based Lauderhill Lions Soccer Club. Moore played by the club besides with the later MLS player Mark Chung and Miami Fusion caribbean international player Reginald Pierre-Jerome. Moore played until 1998 with Lauderhill Lions, before signed with Coral Springs Men's Soccer League side CS Villains.

International career 
Moore earned three caps with the Trinidad and Tobago national football team. He played his international debut in a 1986 FIFA World Cup Qualification game against the Costa Rica national football team in Estadio Ricardo Saprissa Aymá in San José, Costa Rica on 24 April 1985.

Coaching career 
After his retirement he worked as teacher of the St Clair Coaching School in Carnbee Village, Tobago and later coached the under-14 boys team, Lauderhill Lions Optimists team of the South Florida United soccer association.

Personal life 
Both his sons Shaquell and CJ play in the US national youth soccer system. Shaquell also plays for Nashville SC in MLS. Moore is married with Michelle Goddard, a sister of fellow footballer and former national team member of Wendell, Richard Goddard.

References

1964 births
Living people
Association football defenders
Trinidad and Tobago footballers
Trinidad and Tobago international footballers
Expatriate soccer players in the United States
People from Tobago
Trinidad and Tobago expatriate sportspeople in the United States
Trinidad and Tobago football managers
Fairleigh Dickinson Knights men's soccer players